The 1923 Indiana Hoosiers football team represented the Indiana Hoosiers in the 1923 Big Ten Conference football season. The Hoosiers played their home games at Jordan Field in Bloomington, Indiana. The team was coached by Bill Ingram, in his first year as head coach.

Schedule

References

Indiana
Indiana Hoosiers football seasons
Indiana Hoosiers football